Dual specificity testis-specific protein kinase 1 is an enzyme that in humans is encoded by the TESK1 gene.

Function 

This gene product is a serine/threonine protein kinase that contains an N-terminal protein kinase domain and a C-terminal proline-rich domain. Its protein kinase domain is most closely related to those of the LIM motif-containing protein kinases (LIMKs). The encoded protein can phosphorylate myelin basic protein and histone in vitro. The testicular germ cell-specific expression and developmental pattern of expression of the mouse gene suggests that this gene plays an important role at and after the meiotic phase of spermatogenesis.

Interactions 

TESK1 has been shown to interact with YWHAB and SPRY4.

References

Further reading